The Oregon State Bank Building is a former bank building located in northeast Portland, Oregon, and listed on the National Register of Historic Places.

See also
 National Register of Historic Places listings in Northeast Portland, Oregon

References

1927 establishments in Oregon
Bank buildings on the National Register of Historic Places in Oregon
Commercial buildings completed in 1927
Hollywood, Portland, Oregon
National Register of Historic Places in Portland, Oregon
Portland Historic Landmarks